Aydin Balamirza oghlu Mammadov is an Azerbaijani historian, scientist-demographer, specialist on historical demography, Ph.D. in history, and associate professor of the department of "source study, historiography and methods" of Baku State University.

Biography 
Aydin Mammadov was born in 1967 in Sumgait. In 1975–1983, he studied at secondary school number 10 in Sumgait. He graduated from the Baku Pedagogical College named after Mirza Alakbar Sabir in 1983 and served in the Soviet Army in 1987–1989. He graduated with honours from the History faculty of Baku State University In 1989–1994 and was awarded a scholarship named after Karl Marx for excellent study at the university. He worked at Sumqayit State University and at various preparatory courses in 1994–1997.

In 2013, he received a PhD in history on the topic "Turkish policy of Germany and its historiography at the end of the 19th and beginning of the 20th centuries", speciality 5509.01 - "Historiography, source study and methods".

Since 2001, he has been working at the Department of Baku State University, "Source Studies, Historiography, and Methods".

In 2019, Aydin Mammadov wrote the first textbook "Historical Demography" in Azerbaijani language. In the same year, he was awarded “Baku State University 100th anniversary medal”.

Since February 27, 2020, Aydin Mammadov has been an absentee doctoral student at the Faculty of History of the Baku State University, speciality 5509.01 - "Historiography, source studies and methods of historical research" for the degree of Doctor of Historical Sciences.

Participation in international conferences, symposia, seminars 
Attempts by Germany to use national, moral and cultural values in Turkish politics of the late XIX - early XX centuries // Cultural diversity as a socio-political value II National Forum of Cultural Studies Baku, 2010, pp. 201–203.
Turkish policy of Germany in the late 19th - early 20th centuries and its historiography // Azerbaijan on the way to a developed society: realities, prospects: Materials of the republican scientific-practical conference of young researchers dedicated to February 2 - Youth Day Baku, Azerbaijan University February 2, 2011, pp. 221–222.
Economic and political roots of Germany's attempts to gain a foothold in Turkey in the context of historiography // Materials of the International Scientific Conference "Actual Problems of Sustainable Development in the Context of Globalization" dedicated to the 88th anniversary of national leader Heydar Aliyev and the 93rd anniversary. modern Azerbaijani statehood Baku, Azerbaijan University May 4–5, 2011, pp. 460–461.
"The role of museums in strengthening student memory in history lessons." The I Republican Scientific Conference "Research, popularization, protection and restoration of national values protected in museums, archives and libraries" was held at the National History Museum of Azerbaijan, June 20, 2017, pp. 141–145.
The role of museums in teaching historical demography in history lessons. II Republican scientific conference "Research, popularization, protection and restoration of national values protected in museums, archives and libraries", 2018, pp. 170–175.
Issues of historical demography in the studies of Ahmad bey Agaoglu. PROCEEDING International Conference on Sustainable Development And Actual Problems of Humanitarian Sciences, May 14–15, 2018, pp. 469–475.
 Scientific knowledge on the historical demography of the Azerbaijani people. The place and role of the Faculty of History of Baku State University in the socio-political life of Azerbaijan. Republican scientific conference. Baku, October 8–9, 2019.
 Impact of the Second World War on the socio-economic and demographic situation of the population in Azerbaijan // International Scientific Conference "Azerbaijan during the Second World War", June 22, 2020.
 Issues of historical demography in the historiography of Azerbaijan in the second half of the twentieth century. III International Scientific Conference on Humanities and Social Sciences, April 6, 2021.
 Issues of historical demography in the studies of Azerbaijani historians of the second half of the twentieth century. Materials of the IV Republican Scientific and Practical Conference of Young Researchers, April 9, 2021.
 Demographic views on the influence of natural factors on the population in the work of Nizami Ganjavi. PROCEEDING International Conference on Works by Nizami Ganjavi as a literary and historical source, May 7, 2021, Baku, pp. 82–85.
 Historical and demographic views on the family model in the work of Nizami Ganjavi // Materials of the scientific-theoretical conference dedicated to the 880th anniversary of Nizami Ganjavi "Nizami Ganjavi: predecessors and successors - Medieval manuscripts and historical problems of Azerbaijani culture", Institute of Manuscripts named after Muhammad Fizuli ANAS, 22 November 2021.
 Population problems in studies on primitive society in the historiography of Azerbaijan in the second half of the 20th century // Proceedings of the I International Conference on the Fundamentals of the Humanities and Social Sciences, Baku, December 24, 2021.
 Problems of historical demography in studies on the territorial and demographic issues of Azerbaijan in the XIX century in the historiography of Azerbaijan in the second half of the XX century - the beginning of the XXI century. IV International Scientific Conference "World Azerbaijanis: History and Modernity", Baku, December 29-30, 2021
 Issues of historical demography in the study of the processes associated with the ethnogenesis of the Azerbaijani people in the national historiography in the second half of the XX century - the beginning of the XXI century. Proceedings International conference “Ethnogenesis of the Azerbaijani people and the national identity issues”, Baku, October 28, 2022.
 Influence of political processes taking place in Northern Azerbaijan in the 19th century on the demographic situation of Shusha in the historiography of Azerbaijan in the 21st century. Republican scientific conference "Historical and cultural heritage of Karabakh in the museum", Baku, November 1, 2022
 Historical and demographic issues in the scientific creativity of Azerbaijani historian and archeologist Mammadali Huseynov. AICNHS 1st International Conference on new horizons in science, January 12-15, 2023, Cairo, Egypt. pp.108-113.
 Issues of historical demography in the research works of Azerbaijani historians on medieval period in the second half of XX century // I International Scientific and Practical Conference «Modern science: experience, traditions, innovations», January 31 – February 1, 2023, Berlin. Germany. pp.27-32.

Works

Featured articles and programs

In Azerbaijani 
 
 
 [http://static.bsu.az/w8/Tarix%20ve%20onun%20problem/2013%20%20%202/seh.346-350.pdf XIX  
 
 
  Bakı, 2016 (tarixi mənbələrini tərcümə etmişdir.)
 
 
 
 
 
 
 
 
 
 
 
 
 
 
 
 
 
 .
 
 
 
 
 
 
 
 .

In Russian

In English

Scientific books 
 Искендеров А., Мамедов А. Историческая демография. Баку, "Elm və təhsil", 2017, 164 с.
 Мамедов А., Халилзаде А. Историография истории США. Учебное Пособие по специальности 050211 Регионоведение (американистика). Баку, "АГУКИ", 2018, 142 с.
 Məmmədov A. Tarixi demoqrafiya. Dərslik. Bakı, 2019, 232 s.

External links 
 Aydın Məmmədov  in Google Scholar 
 http://history.bsu.edu.az 
 Tarix fakültəsinin tələbələri Aydın Məmmədovla görüşüblər 
 A.Məmmədovun Təqdimatında Elmi Seminar - BDU Tarix Tələbə Elmi Cəmiyyəti

References 

1967 births
21st-century Azerbaijani historians
Living people
People from Sumgait